Zestafoni is a municipality of Georgia, in the region of Imereti. The municipality covers a total area of 423 square kilometres and as of 2014 it had a population total of 57,628 people.
Its main town is Zestafoni which is an important industrial center, with a large ferro-alloy plant processing manganese ore from nearby Chiatura. The municipality is a notable wine-growing region.

Geography
The municipality to the west of the town of Zestafoni is part of the Kolkheti lowlands at a height of 90m-200m, with the land rising to the east to the Imereti plateau at 500m through a hilly zone with narrow rocky gorges. The region is bounded to the south with a low range of mountains rising to about 1,000m. The lowland zone has relatively cold winters averaging -4C in January, with hot summers averaging 24C in August. Precipitation is about 1190mm annually. In the higher areas the temperature is lower and there is more rainfall.  The Kvirila River runs through the region from east to west, fed by many smaller rivers. Flooding is common in the spring.

The municipality is forested with hornbeam, oak, beech, chestnut, alder and many other tree species. The southern range has beech, maple, lime and Imeretian oak. The land has been partly cleared for agriculture in the lowlands and hilly areas, but is more densely forested in the southern mountain range. The forests are home to wolf, fox, jackal, badger, rabbit and smaller animals.

Settlements

Towns
The town of Zestafoni and the smaller neighboring town of Shorapani are industrial centers. 
The Zestafoni ferro-alloy plant processes raw manganese ore shipped by rail down the Kvirila valley from Chiatura, supplying 6% of world demand. It is the largest ferroalloy plant in the country.
There were more factories in the Soviet era, but many have closed down.

Rural areas
The rural areas include the communities of
Boslevi, Dilikauri, Dzirula, Ilemi, Kldeeti, Kvaliti, Kveda Sakara, Kveda Sazano, Meore Sviri, Phuti, Pirveli Sviri, Rodinauli, Sanakhshire, Shrosha, Tskhratskaro, Zeda Sakara and Zovreti. 
Each community typically includes two or three villages. 
There are medieval castles in several villages, notably the Shorapani and Sviri castles in the historical village of Argveti and a castle from the 6th-7th centuries in Tabakini. There are old churches, ancient wine cellars and other points of interest for tourism.

The Zestafoni Municipality has 5,000 hectares of vineyards accounting for 80% of all farmland.
The Sakara Viticulture and Winemaking Scientific-Research Station plays an important role in developing viticulture in the Zestafoni Region. Other crops include maize and vegetables, cattle breeding and swine production.

The district's main settlements are:

Politics 
Zestaponi Municipal Assembly (Georgian: ზესტაფონის საკრებულო, Zestaponis Sakrebulo) is a representative body in Zestaponi Municipality, consisting of 39 members which are elected every four years. The last election was held in October 2021.

See also
 List of municipalities in Georgia (country)

Gallery

References

External links
 Municipalities of Georgia, Statoids.com

Municipalities of Imereti